Tunisia (TUN) competed at the 1983 Mediterranean Games in Casablanca, Morocco.

Nations at the 1983 Mediterranean Games
1983
Mediterranean Games